Salt Haven is a minor river (brook) in the Wealden district of East Sussex, England. Rising from Pevensey Haven in Westham, Salt Haven drains into Pevensey Bay at the English Channel in Pevensey. The Pevensey Bridge Gate in Pevensey Haven just before Salt Haven determines the amount of water that can flow through.

Course 
Located in the Pevensey Levels, as Pevensey Haven reaches Westham and curves south, it becomes known as Salt Haven. Continuing its southerly course, Salt Haven receives the waters of Langley Sewer before flowing southeast, during which it receives the waters of Bill Gut. After reaching the settlement of Pevensey Bay, Salt Haven assumes an easterly course. It then flows north into the English Channel via three outfall pipes.

References

External links 
Sea level at check-for-flooding.service.gov.uk

Rivers of East Sussex
Rivers of the Pevensey Levels